A drishti bommai (Tamil), drishti gombe (Kannada) or drishti bomma (Telugu) is a talisman represented as a doll, predominantly found in South India. Regarded to possess apotropaic properties, these dolls are prominently hung at construction sites, houses, residential buildings, and trucks, intended to ward off evil. They are regarded to be benevolent asuras, featured as intimidating in appearance to frighten malicious forces. Similar to the Gorgoneion heads of ancient Greece, the decorative wide-eyed, often red, yellow, or green moustached masks and can be seen in the Indian states of Tamil Nadu, Karnataka, Telangana, and Andhra Pradesh, and the union territory of Puducherry.

References

Indian iconography
Talismans
Objects believed to protect from evil
Superstitions of India
Magic symbols
Anthropology of religion